MJ Erb (born February 2, 1994) is an American long-distance runner born in Farmington, New York.

Professional
Erb ran 8:29.09 to place seventh in the steeplechase at 2018 USA Outdoor Track and Field Championships in Des Moines, Iowa.	

Erb ran 8:32.78 to win the steeplechase at 2018 Occidental College USATF Distance Classic.

Erb ran 29:43 for 10 km to place ninth at 2018 USA Cross Country Championships in Tallahassee, Florida.

Michael Erb ran 8:26.75 to place seventh in the steeplechase at 2017 USA Outdoor Track and Field Championships at Sacramento state.

Erb represented the United States and earned a silver medal 2016 NACAC Under-23 Championships in Athletics.

A former All-Greater Rochester cross-country standout competed Friday night at the United States Track and Field Olympic Trials in Oregon where he placed 15th in the 2016 United States Olympic Trials (track and field) steeplechase final.

Erb placed 23rd at U20 2013 USA Cross Country Championships in 25:42.9.

NCAA
Erb is an All-American track and field athlete who competes for Ole Miss Rebels track and field. MJ Erb earned an All-American Cross country award from USTFCCCA in November 2014 when he competed at Syracuse University.

Prep
Erb competed for Victor Senior High School in Victor, New York. At the 2012 New York State Public High School Athletic Association, Erb placed sixth in 3000 Steeplechase in 9:32.10. At the 2011 Nike Cross Nationals, Erb placed 18th to earn high school All-American honor.

References

External links
 
 
 MJ Erb at Syracuse University
 MJ Erb at All-Athletics
 
 
 
 MJ Erb  – Victor High School at Athletic.net
 MJ Erb – Victor High School at Dyestat

1994 births
Living people
American male long-distance runners
American male middle-distance runners
Ole Miss Rebels men's track and field athletes
Syracuse Orange men's track and field athletes
People from Farmington, New York
Track and field athletes from New York (state)